"If You're Happy and You Know It" is a popular traditional repetitive children's and drinking song. The song has been noted for its similarities to "Molodejnaya", a song appearing in the 1938 Soviet musical film Volga-Volga.

History
The origin of the melody is not known, but numerous sources trace it back to Spain, Latin America, Latvia or the United States of America.

The song was published in various places through the decades following the late 1960s, including a volume of "constructive recreational activities" for children (1957), a book of drama projects for disabled children (1967), and a nursing home manual (1966).

In 1971, Jonico Music filed for copyright on the song, crediting it to Joe Raposo.

During the early part of the 2000s, the music Recording Industry Association of America actively prosecuted individuals for downloading music using file-sharing services. Widespread media attention was paid to one 12-year-old, whose downloads included "If You're Happy and You Know It" from Kazaa.

In 2007, the song was included as part of the Nihon no Uta Hyakusen, a list of the 100 most well-known folk songs in Japan. It is one of nine songs from foreign countries included on the list. It was selected by the Agency of Cultural Affairs and the National Congress of Parents and Teachers Associations of Japan.

In 2020, Granger Smith recorded a version that relied on alcohol drinking called "Country and Ya Know It".

Lyric variations
Like many children's songs, there are many versions of the lyrics. A popular version goes as follows:
If you're happy and you know it, clap your hands!
If you're happy and you know it, clap your hands!
If you're happy and you know it, and you really want to show it;
If you're happy and you know it, clap your hands!

This verse is usually followed by more which follow the same pattern but say: "If you're happy and you know it, stomp/stamp your feet!", "If you're happy and you know it, shout/say 'hooray'!" or "shout/say 'amen'!", "If you're happy and you know it, do all three!", "If you're happy and you know it, do all four!". Other versions of the song tend to say, "then your face will surely show it" in place of "and you really want to show it"; the form "then you really ought to show it" has also been used. Many variations on the substance of the first three verses exist, including:
"... shout/say, 'Hooray'!"
"... slap your knees!"
"... slap your legs!"
"... clap your hands!"
"... turn around!"
"... snap your fingers!"
"... nod your head!"
"... tap your toe!"
"... honk your nose!"
"... pat your head!"
"... pull your ears!"
"... shout/say, 'We are'!" 
"... stomp/stamp your feet!" 
"... shout/say, 'Ha, ha'!" 
"... shout/say, 'Oh yeah'!" 
"... shout/say, 'Amen'!" 
"... raise your drink!" 
"... give a whistle!" 
"... do all three, four, etc.!"

Melody

There is a notable variation from the 5th measure (including pick-up note) to the 6th measure, attested in Japan.

References

External links 
 Sheet music
 , from Volga-Volga by Isaak Dunayevsky
 

American children's songs
Traditional children's songs
American folk songs
Drinking songs